The American Heart Association (AHA) is a nonprofit organization in the United States that funds cardiovascular medical research, educates consumers on healthy living and fosters appropriate cardiac care in an effort to reduce disability and deaths caused by cardiovascular disease and stroke. Originally formed in New York City in 1915, it is currently headquartered in Dallas, Texas. The American Heart Association is a national voluntary health agency.

They are known for publishing guidelines on cardiovascular disease and prevention, standards on basic life support, advanced cardiac life support (ACLS), and pediatric advanced life support (PALS), and in 2014 issued its first guidelines for preventing strokes in women. They are known also for operating a number of highly visible public service campaigns starting in the 1970s, and also operate a number of fundraising events. In 1994, the Chronicle of Philanthropy, an industry publication, released a study that showed the American Heart Association was ranked as the 5th "most popular charity/non-profit in America." The association was listed as the 22nd largest charity by Forbes in 2018.

The mission of the organization, updated in 2018, is "To be a relentless force for a world of longer, healthier lives."

History

1915–1980s: Founding and early years

The American Heart Association grew out of a set of smaller precursor groups. The primary precursor was the Association for the Prevention and Relief of Heart Disease, formed in New York City in 1915, to study whether patients with heart disease could safely return to work. Several similar organizations formed or evolved in Boston, Philadelphia, and Chicago in the 1920s. Recognizing the need for a national organization to share research and promote findings, the American Heart Association was formed in 1924 by six cardiologists representing several of these precursor groups.

The AHA remained small until the 1940s when it was selected for support by Procter & Gamble, via their PR firm, from a list of applicant charities. Procter & Gamble gave $1.5 million from its radio show, Truth or Consequences, allowing the organization to go national. Procter & Gamble turned cottonseeds from a waste product of cotton production into something that could be sold as a supposedly "heart-healthy" alternative to its competition - animal fats, which were mostly saturated. Procter & Gamble were the inventors of the artificial trans-fat margarine called Crisco (Crystallized Cottonseed Oil), which was touted by the AHA as healthier than butter. We now know that the artificial trans-fat from partially hydrogenated vegetable oils are detrimental to human health. However, CLA (conjugated linoleic acid) is still being researched on its potential effects on human health, research has been overall inconclusive when it came to experiments on humans.

Recommendations regarding limiting saturated fats and cholesterol emerged from a series of epidemiological studies in the 1950s, and related American Heart Association dietary guidelines emerged between 1957 and 1961. The 1957 AHA report included: (1) Diet may play an important role in the pathogenesis of atherosclerosis, (2) The fat content and total calories in the diet are probably important factors, (3) The ratio between saturated and unsaturated fat may be the basic determinant, and (4) A wide variety of other factors besides fat, both dietary and non-dietary, may be important. By 1961, these findings had been strengthened, leading to the new 1961 AHA recommendations: (1) Maintain a correct body weight, (2) Engage in moderate exercise, e.g., walking to aid in weight reduction, (3) Reduce intake of total fat, saturated fat, and cholesterol. Increase intake of polyunsaturated fat, (4) Men with a strong family history of atherosclerosis should pay particular attention to diet modification, and (5) Dietary changes should be carried out under medical supervision. These recommendations continued to become more precise from 1957 to 1980, but maintained "a general coherence among them".

1990s–2000s: Awareness campaigns
In 1994, the Chronicle of Philanthropy, an industry publication, released the results of the largest study of charitable and non-profit organization popularity and credibility. The study showed that the American Heart Association was ranked as the fifth "most popular charity/non-profit in America" of over 100 charities researched with 95 percent of Americans over the age of 12 choosing Love and Like A lot description category.

In 2003 published the "Seventh Report of the Joint National Committee on Prevention, Detection, Evaluation and Treatment of High Blood Pressure" (JNC 7).

On October 28, 2009, The American Heart Association and the Ad Council launched a hands-only CPR public service announcement and website. On November 30, 2009, The American Heart Association announced a new cardiac arrest awareness campaign called Be the Beat. The campaign's aim is to teach 12- to 15-year-olds fun ways to learn the basics of cardiopulmonary resuscitation and how to use an automated external defibrillator.

In 2004 the AHA launched the "Go Red for Women" campaign specifically targeting women, with information about risks and action they can take to protect their health. All revenues from the local and national campaigns go to support awareness, research, education and community programs to benefit women.

2012–present: Recent events and activities

It also carried out a campaign in 2012 to educate more people on how to carry out hands-only CPR. The 2012 campaign, which began in New York City, had Jennifer Coolidge as the spokesperson.

In 2013, the American Heart Association issued a joint guideline recognizing obesity as a disease and recommending its treatment by weight loss.

In 2014, the American Heart Association issued its first guidelines for preventing strokes in women.

In 2015, the American Heart Association officially endorsed the Tobacco 21 campaign, urging local, state and national governments to raise the tobacco and nicotine sales age from 18 to 21.

In 2018, the American Heart Association and American College of Cardiology issued new guidelines for clinicians on the management of cholesterol as a way to reduce risk for heart attack and stroke. Newly included in the guidelines is a recommendation to use coronary artery calcium score if healthcare providers are having difficulty deciding if a patient could benefit from statin medications or should focus solely on lifestyle modifications. The cholesterol guidelines were last updated in 2013.

In 2020 and 2021, the annual flagship meeting of the organization was held virtually owing to the COVID-19 pandemic and resumed as an in-person conference in 2022.

Organization 
The American Heart Association is a partner organization of the World Economic Forum.

Fellowship

Fellowship is open to wide-ranged medical professionals (physicians, scientists, etc.) who demonstrate a major and productive interest in cardiovascular diseases and stroke. The association has 16 different councils. Members (at the Premium Professional or Premium Professional Plus level) of one of these councils can apply for Fellowship. All applicants from all councils will be evaluated against the same criteria. Fellows are entitled to use the post-nominal designation FAHA (Fellow of the American Heart Association), which reflects not only the professional stature of the Fellow but also their record of valuable service to the association and the council. In addition, AHA fellowship offers several benefits; e.g., reduced subscription rates for all AHA print journals and reduced registration fees for AHA Scientific Sessions.

Key people 
Nancy Brown has been the chief executive officer since 2009.
Her salary in 2018 alone was $3,474,435.
Ivor Benjamin, M.D., is the volunteer president of the American Heart Association for its 2018–19 fiscal year. James Postl serves as the volunteer chairperson of the board with his two-year term ending on June 30, 2019.

In February 2020, Kroger chairman and CEO Rodney McMullen was appointed to the AHA CEO Roundtable.

Publications

Journals
The following journals are published by the American Heart Association:
 Hypertension
 Arteriosclerosis, Thrombosis, and Vascular Biology
 Stroke
 Circulation
 Circulation Research
 Circulation Arrhythmia and Electrophysiology
 Journal of the American Heart Association
 Circulation: Genomic and Precision Medicine
 Circulation: Cardiovascular Imaging
 Circulation: Cardiovascular Interventions
 Circulation: Cardiovascular Quality and Outcomes
 Circulation: Heart Failure
 Circulation Research

Standards
 Basic life support
 Advanced cardiac life support (ACLS)
 Pediatric advanced life support (PALS), co-branded with the American Academy of Pediatrics

See also
 American College of Cardiology
 AHA Paul "Bear" Bryant Awards
 American Heart Month
 Automated external defibrillator (AED)

References

External links

 Official website
 A detailed history is available on the American Heart Association website
 Go Red for Women

 
Heart disease organizations
Health charities in the United States
Organizations established in 1924
1924 establishments in the United States
Organizations based in Dallas
Charities based in Texas
Stroke organizations
Medical and health organizations based in Texas
Southwestern Medical District